Gruney is a small, uninhabited island in Shetland, Scotland.  It lies north of the Northmavine peninsula of the Shetland Mainland, from which it is separated by the Gruney Sound.

Gruney has a population of Leach's petrels, one of just two in Shetland. It is not a National Nature Reserve, but the RSPB has a management agreement with the owners.

The island is also home to a lighthouse.

See also

 List of islands in Scotland
 List of lighthouses in Scotland
 List of Northern Lighthouse Board lighthouses

References

External links

 Northern Lighthouse Board

Uninhabited islands of Shetland